is a Japanese author.

Biography
Miyamoto was born in Kobe, Hyōgo Prefecture, Japan and graduated from the faculty of letters at Otemon Gakuin University after which he became a copywriter. In 1970, he began to write his first novel and quit his job. Although he later joined another company, he quit again in 1972.

Bibliography
 Doro no Kawa (1977)
 Hotarugawa (1978)
 Kinshu (1982)  Translated into English in 2005 with the title Kinshu: Autumn Brocade
 Hana no Furu Gogo (1988)
 In 1995 his novel Maboroshi no Hikari was made into a film by director Hirokazu Koreeda.  The English release is entitled Maborosi.

Prizes
1977 Dazai Osamu Prize for Mud River (Doro no Kawa)
1978 Akutagawa Prize for Firefly River (Hotarugawa)
1987 Yoshikawa Eiji Prize for Literature for Yu-Shun

Honors
2020 Order of the Rising Sun, 4th Class, Gold Rays with Rosette

External links
 Miyamoto Teru, “Muddy River”, translated and introduced by Andrew Murakami-Smith, The Asia-Pacific Journal, Vol. 13, Issue 47, No. 1, December 7, 2015.
 J'Lit | Authors : Teru Miyamoto | Books from Japan 
Sencillez y frugalidad: de la belleza en la literatura (Kinshu. Tapiz de otoño - en Español)

1947 births
Living people
People from Kobe
Japanese writers
Akutagawa Prize winners
Recipients of the Order of the Rising Sun, 4th class